Roger C. Chamberlain (born January 14, 1963) is an American politician. A member of the Republican Party, he served four terms in the Minnesota Senate, representing District 53 from 2011 to 2013 and District 38 from 2014 to 2023.

Early life, education, and career
Chamberlain attended Normandale Community College in Bloomington, receiving his A.A.S. in law enforcement. He later earned a B.S. in accounting from Metropolitan State University in Saint Paul. He also served in the United States Navy and in the United States Army National Guard.

Minnesota Senate
Chamberlain was first elected in 2010 from District 53, defeating one-term DFL senator Sandy Rummel. In 2012, 2016, and 2020, he was reelected, representing District 38. In his third term, he chaired the Senate Committee on Taxes. In his fourth term, he chaired the Education Committee and was assistant majority leader. In 2022, he lost reelection to Democratic nominee Heather Gustafson.

Political positions

Abortion
Chamberlain opposes abortion. In 2016, Minnesota Citizens Concerned for Life gave him a 100% voting record.

Social media
In 2020, Chamberlain drew attention to what he termed the addictive nature of social media, proposing a bill to require registration and annual fees for large social media companies to operate in Minnesota, and the creation of a social media impact fund.

The Minnesota Reformer has criticized Chamberlain's own social media use, in 2020 for following and interacting with Bronze Age Pervert on Twitter and "liking" tweets about the book Bronze Age Mindset, which "argues that equality and human rights are unnatural", and in 2021 for "liking" a tweet by radio host and conspiracy theorist Paul Joseph Watson that read, "Retweet if you're pureblood." The Reformer wrote, "It's not clear whether Chamberlain liked the post because he's into pure bloodlines, or because he's an anti-vaxxer".

Personal life
Chamberlain and his wife Annette live in Lino Lakes and have two children.

References

External links

Senator Roger Chamberlain official campaign website
Roger Chamberlain Votes at Votesmart.org

1963 births
Living people
People from Lino Lakes, Minnesota
Metropolitan State University alumni
Republican Party Minnesota state senators
21st-century American politicians